Richard Stoker (8 November 1938 – 24 March 2021) was a British composer, writer, actor and artist.

There was a strong musical tradition in Stoker's family, and he showed an early aptitude, intrigued by the piano keyboard as soon as he was tall enough to reach it. He started playing the piano at the age of six, started to compose at the age of seven, and went to an uncle for piano lessons. At 15 he went to Huddersfield Technical College, studying with Harold Truscott and Winifred Smith.

After initial encouragement from Eric Fenby, Arthur Benjamin and Benjamin Britten, he entered the Royal Academy of Music in 1958 and studied under Lennox Berkeley. He won several prizes at the RAM, culminating in the Mendelssohn Scholarship in 1962, which took him to Paris to study with Nadia Boulanger.  Returning to London in 1963 he was invited to teach at the RAM, and was a Professor of Composition there for over 20 years. He later became Hon Treasurer and a Founder member of the Royal Academy of Music Guild. He was a Fellow of the Royal Academy of Music (FRAM), and also an Associate of the Royal College of Music (ARCM).

An early success as a composer was with the orchestral overture Antic Hay (1961) which won the first Royal Amateur Orchestral Society Award. The Petite Suite of the same year won the first Eric Coates Memorial Prize. Among his other works are the operas Johnson Preserv'd (1967) and Thérèse Raquin (1975), four numbered symphonies and a Little Symphony (spanning 1961-1991), a piano concerto (op.54, 1978), three each of string quartets, piano trios and violin sonatas, as well as song cycles, choral (the dramatic cantata Ecce homo, 1962) and organ music (Organ Symphony, op. 58, 1980). Stoker declared the piano to be his favourite instrument, with the guitar a close second: he produced a number of pieces for both instruments. His style was modern but accessible, full of his optimistic, joie de vivre personality.

He edited Composer magazine between 1969 and 1980, and wrote entries on eight musicians for the Oxford DNB: Sir Thomas Armstrong, Arthur Benjamin, Alan Bush, Janet Craxton, Eric Fenby, Anthony Milner, Robert Simpson and Harold Truscott. Sometimes referred to as a Renaissance Man, he was also a writer: two novels, short stories and poetry (Words without Music, 1970, and Portrait of a Town, 1974), three plays (unpublished) and an autobiography, Open Window – Open Door, 1985. As an artist he exhibited some of his drawings and paintings. 

In later years he enjoyed acting in films and TV - he appeared in over 100 productions, including Pirates of the Caribbean, Dark Shadows, Maleficent, Hercules (as body double for John Hurt), Last Christmas and MotherFatherSon.

Stoker's first marriage was to Jacqueline (née Trelfer) in 1962. They were divorced in 1985. He married his second wife, Gill (née Watson), in 1986. He was a member of the Garrick Club for several years.

References

Music Web International pages on Stoker by John France (April 2004), accessed 8 February 2010
Townend, Richard (1968): 'Richard Stoker' The Musical Times, Vol. 109, No. 1503 (May, 1968), pp. 424–426

External links
Playlist of selected musical items.
Performance by Karen Wong and Lance Mok of Sonatina for Flute and Piano.
Performance by William Wielgus of Three Pieces for Solo Oboe.
Performance by Matthew Schellhorn of Piano Sonata No. 1.
Performance by Einar Johannesson and Philip Jenkins of Sonatina for Clarinet and Piano.
Performance by Rhymney Valley Festival Orchestra of Chorale for Strings.
Publications on WorldCat.
Composer information on Impulse.
Acting website, accessed 29 March 2021

1938 births
2021 deaths
People from Castleford
20th-century English composers
20th-century English novelists
20th-century classical composers
21st-century classical composers
English classical composers
English opera composers
Male opera composers
English short story writers
English male poets
English male short story writers
English male novelists
English male classical composers
Associates of the Royal College of Music
Fellows of the Royal Academy of Music
20th-century British short story writers
20th-century English male writers
20th-century British male musicians
21st-century British male musicians